Joshua Dunkley (born 9 January 1997) is an Australian rules footballer who plays for the Brisbane Lions in the Australian Football League (AFL), having been drafted as a father-son pick to the .

Early life
Dunkley was born in Sydney, the second of three children to  footballer Andrew and his wife Lisa. After Andrew retired from AFL football in 2002, the family returned south to country Victoria and lived on a farm near Yarram in the Gippsland region. Dunkley participated in the Auskick program at Yarram. During his time playing for Gippsland Power, Dunkley developed into a promising leader (captaining the team in his final year), and his strong overhead marking skills, along with his ability to win the contested ball, had many comparing him to Sydney star Luke Parker. He also spent time with Sydney's youth academy and played six games for 's VFL team in 2015. In the lead-up to the 2015 AFL draft, Dunkley attracted keen interest from a number of clubs, especially his father's former club Sydney, but when the Western Bulldogs bid for Dunkley with the 25th selection, Sydney chose not to match the bid. After losing players like Nick Malceski and Adam Goodes, the club were looking for players with strong kicking skills and although Dunkley was under serious consideration, it was felt that his kicking skills needed improvement. He thus became the first player under the new father–son drafting rules to have a draft bid placed on him which was not matched by his father's former club.

He graduated from Gippsland Grammar School in 2014 and spent 2015 working at the school as a teacher's assistant prior to being drafted.

AFL career
Dunkley made his AFL debut in round 1, 2016 against . He also scored his first AFL goal in that match. After his performance against  in round 20 where he recorded nineteen disposals, four tackles, three clearances, and three inside-50s, he was the round nomination for the Rising Star. Dunkley would then go on to play a key role in the club's amazing finals campaign, showing composure beyond his years on the biggest stage. Then the following week against  in the semi-final, Dunkley was rated among the Bulldogs' best players, kicking a crucial goal in the second quarter as well as gathering 23 possessions in a memorable 23-point win. In the heart-stopping preliminary final win against , Dunkley again recorded over 20 possessions, and in the grand final against his father's side, he gathered 15 disposals and seven tackles. At 19, he was the youngest player in the premiership side.

Following a best-and-fairest season for the Bulldogs in 2022, Dunkley requested to be traded to the Brisbane Lions. He was traded on the final day of trade period.

Statistics
 Statistics are correct to the end of the 2021 season

|-
|- style="background:#eaeaea;"
| scope=row bgcolor=F0E68C | 2016# 
|style="text-align:center;"|
| 20 || 17 || 9 || 12 || 152 || 136 || 288 || 76 || 98 || 0.5 || 0.7 || 8.9 || 8.0 || 16.9 || 4.5 || 5.8
|-
! scope="row" style="text-align:center" | 2017
|style="text-align:center;"|
| 20 || 7 || 5 || 7 || 47 || 39 || 86 || 25 || 29 || 0.7 || 1.0 || 6.7 || 5.7 || 12.3 || 3.6 || 4.1
|- style="background-color: #EAEAEA"
! scope="row" style="text-align:center" | 2018
|style="text-align:center;"|
| 5 || 19 || 11 || 15 || 193 || 223 || 416 || 93 || 113 || 0.6 || 0.8 || 10.2 || 11.7 || 21.9 || 4.9 || 6.0
|-
! scope="row" style="text-align:center" | 2019
|style="text-align:center;"|
| 5 || 23 || 11 || 8 || 307 || 344 || 651 || 95 || 141 || 0.8 || 0.5 || 13.4 || 15.0 || 28.3 || 4.1 || 6.1
|-style="background-color: #EAEAEA"
! scope="row" style="text-align:center" | 2020
|style="text-align:center;"|
| 5 || 12 || 6 || 5 || 85 || 134 || 219 || 28 || 71 || 0.5 || 0.4 || 7.0 || 11.2 || 18.3 || 2.3 || 5.9
|- class="sortbottom"
|-
! scope="row" style="text-align:center" | 2021
|style="text-align:center;"|
| 5 || 15 || 5 || 8 || 129 || 220 || 349 || 56 || 78 || 0.3 || 0.5 || 8.6 || 14.7 || 23.3 || 3.7 || 5.2
|- style="background-color: #EAEAEA"
! colspan=3| Career
! 93
! 47
! 55
! 913
! 1096
! 2009
! 373
! 530
! 0.5
! 0.6
! 9.8
! 11.8
! 21.6
! 4.0
! 5.7
|}

Notes

Honours and achievements
Team
AFL premiership: 2016
Individual
Chris Grant Best First Year Player: 2016
AFL Rising Star nominee: 2016
 22 Under 22 team: 2019(vc)
 Runner Up Best and Fairest 2019 (Doug Hawkins Medal)
John van Groningen Domestique Award: 2019
Tony Liberatore Most Improved Player Award: 2018, 2019

References

External links

Living people
1997 births
Australian rules footballers from Victoria (Australia)
Western Bulldogs players
Western Bulldogs Premiership players
Gippsland Power players
One-time VFL/AFL Premiership players